Ectoedemia liechtensteini is a moth of the family Nepticulidae. It is found from the Czech Republic and Slovakia to Austria and Serbia.

The wingspan is 4.4-5.2 mm. Adults are on wing from April to June. There is one generation per year.

The larvae feed on Quercus cerris. They mine the leaves of their host plant. The mine is identical to that of Ectoedemia heringi.

External links
Fauna Europaea
bladmineerders.nl
A Taxonomic Revision Of The Western Palaearctic Species Of The Subgenera Zimmermannia Hering And Ectoedemia Busck s.str. (Lepidoptera, Nepticulidae), With Notes On Their Phylogeny

Nepticulidae
Moths of Europe
Moths described in 1944